Joanne Etheridge  is an Australian physicist. She is Director of the Monash Centre for Electron Microscopy and Professor in the Department of Materials Science and Engineering at Monash University.

Academic career
Etheridge graduated with a BSc from the University of Melbourne and a PhD in physics from RMIT University in 1993. In 1994 she moved to the University of Cambridge as Rosalind Franklin Research Fellow, Newnham College and in 1997 became a senior research associate in the Department of Materials Science and Metallurgy there. From 1999 to 2003 she was Royal Society University Research Fellow in the same department. From 2005 to 2008 she was also a visiting professor at the Brockhouse Institute at McMaster University. 

She returned to Monash University in Melbourne to set up and lead the Monash Centre for Electron Microscopy, where she has pioneered electron diffraction and microscopy techniques and ultra-high resolution electron microscopy in Australia. As of 2021 she is on the Editorial Board of the international journal, Ultramicroscopy.

Awards and recognition

Etheridge won the University of Cambridge's K. M. Stott Prize in 1995 and the John Sanders Medal awarded by the Australian Microscopy and Microanalysis Society in 2016. In 2012 she presented the Lloyd Rees Lecture of the Australian Academy of Science.

In 2019 she was elected Fellow of the Australian Academy of Science.

In 2022 she was named the Australian Research Council Georgina Sweet Australian Laureate Fellow

Selected works

References

Living people
Year of birth missing (living people)
University of Melbourne alumni
RMIT University alumni
Fellows of the Australian Academy of Science
Academic staff of McMaster University
Academic staff of Monash University
Australian physicists